3, The Grove, Highgate, in the London Borough of Camden, is a 17th-century house built by William Blake. In the 19th century it was home of the poet Samuel Taylor Coleridge; in the 20th, the novelist J. B. Priestley; and in the 21st, the model Kate Moss. It is a Grade II* listed building.

History
In the 17th century, Highgate was a hamlet to the north of London, situated in the midst of the extensive Middlesex estate of the Bishops of London. Nos. 1–6, The Grove, Highgate were built in around 1688 by a City of London merchant William Blake. Constructed in the gardens of a large mansion called Dorchester House, Blake intended the speculative development to fund a charity school he had established in the main building.

In 1816, Samuel Taylor Coleridge, moved to the Highgate home of his doctor, James Gillman, seeking treatment for his addiction to opium. In 1823 the Gillmans moved to No. 3, The Grove, installing Coleridge in a suite of rooms on the top floor. He remained there until his death in 1834; writing, revising and republishing earlier works such as Kubla Khan, receiving visitors and becoming lauded as "the Sage of Highgate".

In 1931 the house was bought by J. B. Priestley, using the profits from his novels, which had brought literary and worldly success since the publication of The Good Companions in 1929. He engaged Seely & Paget to reconstruct the house and the landscape architects Mawson's to redesign the garden.

In the 21st century, No.3 was home to the model, Kate Moss. Moss sold the house in 2022.

Architecture and description
Bridget Cherry, in her 2002 revised London 4: North edition of the Pevsner Buildings of England series, describes Nos. 1–6, The Grove, as "the finest group in Highgate". The row was originally built as three pairs of semi-detached houses, of two storeys with dormers above. Most have been greatly altered since. No. 3 is now of three storeys, with a basement and a slate roof. The construction material is red brick.

No. 3 is a Grade II* listed building, the listing including the low wall which fronts the house, and its wrought iron railings and lamp.

Notes

References

Sources
 

Houses completed in the 17th century
Grade II* listed houses
Grade II* listed buildings in the London Borough of Camden
Samuel Taylor Coleridge